Nemania serpens is a plant pathogen.

References

External links 
 Index Fungorum
 USDA ARS Fungal Database

Fungal plant pathogens and diseases
Xylariales
Fungi of Europe
Fungi described in 1787
Taxa named by Christiaan Hendrik Persoon